Durham Students' Union, operating as Durham SU, is the students' union of Durham University in Durham, England. It is an organisation, originally set up as the Durham Colleges Students’ Representative Council in 1899 and renamed in 1969, with the intention of representing and providing welfare and services for the students of the University of Durham.

Location

The Students' Union occupies and manages Dunelm House, a university-owned building in the centre of Durham where a wide variety of student activities take place. Designed by Architects Co-Partnership, the Brutalist, angular concrete building was completed in 1966 under the supervision of architect Sir Ove Arup, whose Kingsgate Bridge, adjacent, opened two years earlier.  Built into the steeply sloping bank of the River Wear, Dunelm House is notable internally for the fact that the main staircase linking all five levels of the building runs in an entirely straight line. This was intended by the building's architects to create the feeling of an interior street.

In 1968 Dunelm House won a Civic Trust award, though it has been described by students as "The ugliest building in Durham". On the other hand, Sir Nikolaus Pevsner, the noted architecture historian, considered the building, "Brutalist by tradition but not brutal to the landscape ... the elements, though bold, [are] sensitively composed." Durham City Council's Local Plan notes that the "powerful" building, together with Kingsgate Bridge, "provides an exhilarating pedestrian route ... out into open space over the river gorge".

Social events
During the late 1960s and the 1970s Dunelm House was a popular music venue, hosting bands including Pink Floyd, Wishbone Ash and Procol Harum.  According to their drummer Simon Kirke, Free's most popular song All Right Now was written by bassist Andy Fraser and singer Paul Rodgers in their dressing room in Dunelm House, after a set of slower material had failed to excite the audience.

Relation to colleges
Durham University is a collegiate university and therefore the role of the central students' union is different from most other universities. Each of Durham's colleges has its own student representative body, known in most colleges as the Junior Common Room, which provides services and organises events within the college; while many decisions within the central Students' Union are made with the involvement of JCR SU Representatives. Recently, a small number of the JCRs have opted to disaffiliate from the students' union - including University College and Hild Bede - following the controversial 2020 officer and trustee elections.

Future 
The announcement in early 2005 that Durham SU had been operating with a large annual loss has prompted serious debate on the future of the organisation and the building in which it is currently based. According to Durham's student newspaper, Palatinate, Durham SU's debt to the bank and its parent institution stood at £303,000 in June 2005. Restructuring of the organisation followed and resulted in a small surplus being posted for the year 2005/06. In 2007/08 a reorganisation took place, which resulted in the adoption of a new constitution. Governance of Durham SU was also updated with the introduction of a Board of Trustees consisting of the five student officers, four elected student trustees and five co-opted trustees.

On a number of occasions, some have suggested have that Durham SU might disaffiliate from the NUS, however until 2009 none of those opposed to affiliation had pushed the issue to a full student debate and vote. In 2009 however, a referendum took place proposing that Durham SU should stay affiliated to the NUS. Students voted convincingly in favour of affiliation with 80% (2564) of students who voted voting to stay affiliated and 20% (624) voting to disaffiliate.

Shortly after this, controversy arose regarding a planned debate, "Multiculturalism in Britain", at the Durham Union Society, which was to involve a recently elected BNP MEP, and which was subsequently cancelled over alleged fears for student safety, reopened the issue of NUS affiliation. A petition for a second referendum was put before the Union  and on 12 March 2010, the referendum concluded with a majority of voting students voting to disaffiliate from the NUS, meaning that Durham Students' Union disaffiliated from the NUS after the end of the 2009-2010 academic year.

A third referendum on NUS affiliation was held in January 2011 with 60% of students voting to reaffiliate with NUS.

In 2020, there was a controversy surrounding the results of the 2020 election, with 58% of votes for Re-Open Nominations being cast aside as a result of alleged rule breaches by the Re-Open Nominations campaign. The Re-Open Nominations campaign faced accusations of racism and after the election has been cited as the cause of a spike in racist online abuse. Several college Common Rooms have chosen to 'disaffiliate', 'disassociate' or 'disengage'  from the Students Union citing the decision to dismiss Re-Open Nominations.

In 2022, Durham university's student newspaper Palatinate's editorial board voted 97% in favour of becoming an independent newspaper, and leaving Durham Students Union.

Notable former officers
A number of notable figures have been involved in Durham Students' Union in the past.  These include:
 Andrew McFarlane (judge), former President
 Michael Izza, former President 
 Mo Mowlam, former Deputy President (Education and Welfare)
 Jeremy Vine, former Editor of Palatinate
 George Alagiah, former Editor of Palatinate

Former Presidents 
This list includes all presidents of the Durham Students' Union since being re-named in 1969/70.

1970-71 Richard J. Ayre, University

1971-72 Michael Eccles, St Cuthbert's

1972-73 Patrick Wolfe, St Chad's

1973-74 John Spens, Collingwood

1974-75 Adrian Dorber, St John's

1975-76 Andrew McFarlane, Collingwood

1976-77 John McGahan, University

1977-78 David J. Smith, Ushaw

1978-79 A.C. Jenkins, Van Mildert

1979-80 S.P.S. Weatherseed, St Cuthbert's

1980-81 Peter G. Gray, University

1981-82 Robert J. Beckley, University

1982-83 Michael D.M. Izza, St Cuthbert's

1983-84 Jacqui Mellor, Trevelyan

1984-85 Simon Pottinger, University

1985-86 Patrick J. Martin, Collingwood

1986-87 Katherine M. Ross, Van Mildert

1987-88 Nicholas V. Thorne, Grey

1988-89 Graeme N. Rainey, Van Mildert

1989-90 Jonathan S. Rich, Hild Bede

1990-91 Aidan W.G. Poole, St Aidan's

1991-92 Robert W. Groves, St John's

1992-93 Daniel Redford, St Cuthbert's

1993-94 Jon Walsh, Van Mildert

1994-95 Richard Taylor, Van Mildert

1995-96 Emily Baldock, Van Mildert

1996-97 Ewan Jenkins, St Cuthbert's

1997-98 Charlotte Nash-Wanklin, Collingwood

1998-99 Brian Ahearne, Hatfield

1999-00 Dave Park, Trevelyan

2000-01 Eddie Moore, Grey

2001-02 Emily Fieran-Reed, St Mary's

2002-03 Ben Wood

2003-04 Craig Jones

2004-05 Tom Page

2005-06 Nick Pickles

2006-07 Alex Duncan

2007-08 Flo Herbert, Van Mildert

2008-09 Andrew Welch, Van Mildert

2009-10 Natalie Crisp, Grey

2010-11 Samuel Roseveare, Van Mildert

2011-12 Mike King

2012-13 Archie Dallas

2013-15 Dan Slavin, Stephenson

2015-16 Millie Tanner, St Cuthbert's

2016-17 Alice Dee, St Aidan's

2017-18 Megan Croll, St Cuthbert's

2018-19 George Walker, Van Mildert

2019-20 Kate McIntosh, St Cuthbert's

2020-21 Seun Twins, Hild Bede

2021-22 Joe McGarry, St Aidan's

References

External links
 Durham Students' Union
 DUCK Home page

Students' unions in England
Students' Union